The 2019 IFSC Climbing World Championships, the 16th edition, were held in Hachioji, Japan from 11 to 21 August 2019. The championships consisted of lead, speed, bouldering, and combined events. The paraclimbing event was held separately from 16 to 17 July in Briançon, France. The combined event also served as an Olympic qualifying event for the 2020 Summer Olympics.

Medal summary

Medalists

Medal table

Qualification for the 2020 Summer Olympics

The seven best climbers of the combined event automatically qualify for the 2020 Summer Olympics, where sport climbing will make its debut. There are seven spots available per gender, with a maximum of two spots per country.

The qualifiers for the 2020 Summer Olympics from the 2019 World Championships Combined events are:

*  , as the host nation, were guaranteed two quota places in each event. However, despite four climbers of each gender being in qualification positions in Hachioji, only two athletes of each gender could receive Olympic invitations. Ogata and Nonaka were later named after some debate as to whether the Japanese team could chose their two athletes, or whether the spots must go to the top two qualifying athletes.

Schedule 
All times and dates use Japan Standard Time (UTC+9)

Bouldering

Women

Men

Lead

Women

Men

Speed

Women
Aleksandra Miroslaw won the women's speed final against Di Niu. In the small final Anouck Jaubert (7.534) won against YiLing Song (9.768) and secured the third place.

Men
Ludovico Fossali won the men's speed final against Jan Kriz. In the small final Stanislav Kokorin (5.835) won against Danyil Boldyrev (5.934) and secured the third place.

Combined

Climbers who participated in all three events of bouldering, lead, and speed would receive a combined ranking, and the top 20 of each gender would automatically qualify for the combined event.

In combined competition, scoring is based on a multiplication formula, with points awarded by calculating the product of the three finishing ranks achieved in each discipline within the combined event. A competitor finishing with a first, a second and a sixth would thus be awarded 1 x 2 x 6 = 12 points, with the lowest scoring competitor winning.

Women

Men

See also
 IFSC Paraclimbing World Championships
 Sport climbing at the 2020 Summer Olympics

References

External links 
 Official website
 IFSC Youtube Channel with live streams of the events

IFSC Climbing World Championships
World Climbing Championships
IFSC
IFSC
International sports competitions hosted by Japan